World Waits is the second full-length album by musician Jeremy Enigk, following Return of the Frog Queen (1996). World Waits was released October 17, 2006, on Enigk's own label, Lewis Hollow Records.

Track listing
 "A New Beginning" – 1:27
 "Been Here Before" – 4:11
 "River to Sea" – 3:00
 "City Tonight" – 5:06
 "Canons" – 3:59
 "Damien Dreams" – 3:37
 "Wayward Love" – 2:18
 "Dare a Smile" – 3:08
 "World Waits" – 4:34
 "Burn" – 5:05

Chart positions

Album

Personnel
Kevin Barrans – Accordion
Dalton Brand – Mastering
Jason Bringle – Drum Programming
Joel Brown – Engineer
Jenna Conrad – Cello
Jeremy Enigk – Bass, Guitar, Drums, Keyboards, Vocals, Producer, Engineer, Mixing
Jon Ervie – Engineer
Casey Foubert – Drums, Engineer
Mark Greenberg – Engineer
Adrianna Hulscher – Violin
Matt Johnson – Drums
Andrew Kelly – Artwork
Kevin Krentz – Cello
Rebecca K. Lowe – Violin
Nick Macri – Bass
James McAlister – Drums
Nathan Medina – Viola
Andy Myers – Vocals
Heidi Myers – Vocals
Josh Myers – Bass, Trombone, Arranger, Keyboards, Vocals, Producer, Engineer, Orchestration, Mixing
Coral Sepúlveda – Violin
Joe Skyward – Bass, Engineer
Austin Sousa – Engineer
Greg Suran – Guitar, Engineer
Eileen Swanson – Viola
Mark Swanson – Vocals, Photography
Rosie Thomas – Vocals
Kanaan Tupper – Drums, Mixing
Jen Wood – Vocals

References

	

2006 albums
Jeremy Enigk albums
Albums recorded at Robert Lang Studios